Little Leigh is a civil parish in Cheshire West and Chester, England. Other than the village of Little Leigh, the parish is entirely rural. It contains eleven buildings that are recorded in the National Heritage List for England as designated listed buildings, all of which are at Grade II. This grade is the lowest of the three gradings given to listed buildings and is applied to "buildings of national importance and special interest". The A49 road runs to the west of the parish, the A533 road to the northeast, and the River Weaver to the south. Traversing the parish is the Trent and Mersey Canal. Four of the listed buildings are associated with the canal: two bridges, an aqueduct, and a milepost. The other listed buildings consist of a former farmhouse, now a public house, with two of its associated buildings, another farmhouse, a cottage, and a church with its lychgate.

Buildings

See also
Listed buildings in Acton Bridge
Listed buildings in Barnton
Listed buildings in Comberbach
Listed buildings in Dutton
Listed buildings in Weaverham
Listed buildings in Whitley

References
Citations

Sources

Listed buildings in Cheshire West and Chester
Lists of listed buildings in Cheshire